Silvia Paredes (born 23 January 1983) is an Ecuadorian long distance runner who specialises in the marathon. She competed in the women's marathon event at the 2016 Summer Olympics.

References

External links
 

1983 births
Living people
Ecuadorian female long-distance runners
Ecuadorian female marathon runners
Place of birth missing (living people)
Athletes (track and field) at the 2016 Summer Olympics
Olympic athletes of Ecuador
South American Games silver medalists for Ecuador
South American Games bronze medalists for Ecuador
South American Games medalists in athletics
Competitors at the 2002 South American Games
21st-century Ecuadorian women